Ambohidanerana is a rural commune in Madagascar. It belongs to the district of Soavinandriana, which is a part of Itasy Region. The population of the commune was 10,786 in 2018.

The commune is situated at 8 km from Soavinandriana on the National road 43.

References

Populated places in Itasy Region